Theodore Millon (August 18, 1928 – January 29, 2014) was an American psychologist known for his work on personality disorders. He founded the Journal of Personality Disorders and was the inaugural president of the International Society for the Study of Personality Disorders. In 2008 he was awarded the Gold Medal Award For Life Achievement in the Application of Psychology by the American Psychiatric Association and the American Psychological Foundation named the "Theodore Millon Award in Personality Psychology" after him. Millon developed the Millon Clinical Multiaxial Inventory, worked on the diagnostic criteria for Passive-Aggressive Personality Disorder, worked on editions of the Diagnostic and Statistical Manual of Mental Disorders, and developed subtypes of a variety of personality disorders.

Biography
Millon was born in Brooklyn in 1928, the only child of immigrant Jewish parents from Lithuania and Poland. His 19th-century ancestors came from the town of Valozhyn, then a part of the Russian Empire. He studied psychology, physics, and philosophy as an undergraduate at the City College of New York and went on to receive his PhD from the University of Connecticut in 1954, with a dissertation on "the authoritarian personality."

Millon was a member of the board of trustees of Allentown State Hospital, a large Pennsylvania psychiatric hospital for 15 years. Shortly thereafter he became the founding editor of the Journal of Personality Disorders and the inaugural president of the International Society for the Study of Personality Disorders. He was Professor Emeritus at Harvard Medical School and the University of Miami.

In 2008, Millon was awarded the Gold Medal Award For Life Achievement in the Application of Psychology by the American Psychological Association. The American Psychological Foundation presents an award named after Millon, known as the "Theodore Millon Award in Personality Psychology," to honor outstanding psychologists engaged in "advancing the science of personality psychology including the areas of personology, personality theory, personality disorders, and personality measurement."

Theoretical work
Millon has written numerous popular works on personality, developed diagnostic questionnaire tools such as the Millon Clinical Multiaxial Inventory, and contributed to the development of earlier versions of the Diagnostic and Statistical Manual of Mental Disorders.

Among other diagnoses, Millon advocated for an expanded version of passive aggressive personality disorder, which he termed 'negativistic' personality disorder and argued could be diagnosed by criteria such as "expresses envy and resentment toward those apparently more fortunate" and "claims to be luckless, ill-starred, and jinxed in life; personal content is more a matter of whining and grumbling than of feeling forlorn and despairing" (APA, 1991, R17). Passive-Aggressive Personality Disorder was expanded somewhat as an official diagnosis in the DSM-III-R but then relegated to the appendix of DSM-IV, tentatively renamed 'Passive-Aggressive (Negativistic) Personality Disorder'.

Millon's personality disorder subtypes
Millon devised a set of subtypes for each of the DSM personality disorders:

 Sadistic (psychopathic) personality disorder subtypes
 Self-defeating (masochistic) personality disorder subtypes
 Schizotypal personality disorder subtypes
 Schizoid personality disorder subtypes
 Paranoid personality disorder subtypes
 Antisocial (sociopathic) personality disorder subtypes
 Borderline personality disorder subtypes
 Histrionic personality disorder subtypes
 Narcissistic personality disorder subtypes
 Dependent personality disorder subtypes
 Obsessive-compulsive personality disorder subtypes
 Avoidant personality disorder subtypes
 Passive-aggressive (negativistic) personality disorder subtypes
 Depressive personality disorder subtypes
 Exuberant/Hypomanic (turbulent) personality disorder subtypes
 Decompensated Personality Disorder

Books
 1969: Modern Psychopathology: A Biosocial Approach to Maladaptive Learning and Functioning, Saunders
 1981: Disorders of Personality: DSM-III: Axis II. John Wiley & Sons 
 1985: (with George S. Everly, Jr.) Personality and Its Disorders. John Wiley and Sons 
 1996: (with Roger D. Davis) Disorders of Personality: DSM IV and Beyond  2nd edition, John Wiley & Sons 
 1974: (with Renée Millon) Abnormal behavior and personality: a biosocial learning approach, Saunders
 2004: Personality Disorders in Modern Life, John Wiley and Sons. 
 2004: Masters of the Mind: exploring the story of mental illness. John Wiley & Sons. 
 2007: (with Seth Grossman) Moderating Severe Personality Disorders: A Personalized Psychotherapy Approach, John Wiley & Sons.
 2007: (with Seth Grossman) Resolving Difficult Clinical Syndromes: A Personalized Psychotherapy Approach, John Wiley & Sons.
 2007: (with Seth Grossman) Overcoming Resistant Personality Disorders: A Personalized Psychotherapy Approach, John Wiley & Sons.
 2008: (editor with Paul H. Blaney) Oxford Textbook of Psychopathology, 2nd Ed., Oxford University Press.
 2008: (editor with Robert Krueger and Erik Simonsen) Contemporary Directions in Psychopathology: Toward the DSM-V and ICD-11, Guilford Press
 2008: The Millon inventories: a practitioner's guide to personalized clinical assessment, Guilford Press 
 2011: Disorders of Personality: Introducing a DSM/ICD Spectrum from Normal to Abnormal, 3rd edition John Wiley & Sons 

See also
 Millon Clinical Multiaxial Inventory
 Pyotr Gannushkin (1875-1933) — a Russian psychiatrist who created a classification of personality disorders, then known as "psychopathies", that intersect in many respects with those of Theodore Millon.

References

Sources
 Theodore Millon, a Student of Personality, Dies at 85, The New York Times'', January 31, 2014.

External links
 The Millon Personality Group

1928 births
2014 deaths
City University of New York alumni
University of Connecticut alumni
20th-century American psychologists
20th-century American Jews
Harvard Medical School faculty
Narcissism writers
Lafayette High School (New York City) alumni
21st-century American Jews